Rabbi Meyer Juzint (June 15, 1924 – October 3, 2001) was a talmudic scholar and faculty member of the Ida Crown Jewish Academy in Chicago, and the Hebrew Theological College in Skokie, Illinois.

Biography
Born in Šeduva (Shaduva), Lithuania, outside of Kovno, Rabbi Juzint studied at the nearby Slabodka yeshiva until the start of World War II. As a young student, Rabbi Juzint was imprisoned at Auschwitz and Bergen-Belsen. All of his family perished during the war. Following his liberation in Europe, Rabbi Juzint moved to the United States, getting a job as a Jewish educator in the late 1940s in Chicago.

From 1950 until 2000, Rabbi Juzint served as a teacher and mentor to hundreds of students throughout many years. Rabbi Juzint remained unmarried, and dedicated his life to his hundreds of students; his only relatives were cousins in Chicago, Israel and South Africa.

Besides being a known Talmudic scholar who is said to have had an encyclopedic knowledge of the Talmud and Bible, Rabbi Juzint was also a poet and author, having published books on Talmud and Jewish philosophy.

After his death, Juzint was buried in Israel.

References

Publications

1924 births
2001 deaths
Lithuanian emigrants to the United States
American Orthodox rabbis
20th-century American rabbis